Lasionycta caesia is a moth of the family Noctuidae. It occurs in the Cascade Mountains of northern Washington and the British Columbia Coast Range to 58 degrees north latitude.

It occurs in rocky alpine tundra near tree line and is nocturnal.

The wingspan is 30–34 mm for males and 32–35 mm for females. Adults are on wing from mid-July to mid-August.

External links
A Revision of Lasionycta Aurivillius (Lepidoptera, Noctuidae) for North America and notes on Eurasian species, with descriptions of 17 new species, 6 new subspecies, a new genus, and two new species of Tricholita Grote

Lasionycta